Kihelkonna is a small borough in Saare County, on the western part of Saaremaa Island, Estonia. It was the administrative centre of Kihelkonna Parish (until 2017).

Gallery

References

Boroughs and small boroughs in Estonia
Populated places in Saare County